Manada Creek is a  tributary of Swatara Creek in Dauphin County, Pennsylvania in the United States. The watershed drains approximately 32 sq mi (83 km). The name is derived the Lenape word "menatey", meaning "island".

Course
The creek is born in Blue Mountain at Fort Indiantown Gap,  East Hanover Township by the confluence of several branches, flowing southwest. The gap through the mountains which it flows through is known as Manada Gap. Later, it becomes the border of East Hanover and West Hanover townships, continuing to wind through forests and agricultural farmland before spilling into the Swatara Creek along the outskirts of the unincorporated community of Sand Beach.

The tributary Walnut Run joins Manada Creek in East Hanover Township.

Variant names
The stream was known originally as Monody Creek. Several variant names not included by the Geographic Names Information System, but have been recorded through various sources:
Manady
Manity
Mannadys
Monady
Monaday
Monnaday
Monaidy
Monday

See also
List of rivers of Pennsylvania
Fort Manada
Manada Furnace
Manada Gap, Pennsylvania
Manada Hill, Pennsylvania

References

External links
 Manada Conservancy
 Community Organizations
 U.S. Geological Survey: PA stream gauging stations
 USGS 01573482 Water Data - Manada Creek at Manada Gap, PA
 Indian Names data chart
"Chapter 4"

Rivers of Dauphin County, Pennsylvania
Rivers of Pennsylvania
Tributaries of Swatara Creek